The Christopher Erb House is a stone house finished in 1799. It stands in Silver Run under a Westminster, MD zip code (21158). It is on a  property, split in two, and borders on Big Pipe Creek. The house has experienced two small fires, multiple hits from Black Locust trees in Hurricane Isabel, and detrimental building practices inside and outside the stone walls. The house is historically significant as an example of Pennsylvania German architecture and it reflects the influence of Pennsylvania Germans in Carroll County.

It was listed on the National Register of Historic Places in 1985.

The main house, finished in 1799 as evident by the date stone in the western gable, was constructed as a two family German style house.  However, the exterior is in the Georgian style, with the southern elevation symmetrical and minimal decorative elements at the doorway.  The southern elevation, the original front of the building, has more cut stone, although most of the house is constructed of field stone.  Further down the slope of the knoll the main house sits on is a two-story spring house, the original house on the property.  This is constructed as a traditional German colonial house, with a spring room and kitchen room on the bottom level.  This house is listed in the 1760 tax records, and is assumed to be constructed between 1755 and 1760.

References

Houses completed in 1799
Houses in Carroll County, Maryland
Houses on the National Register of Historic Places in Maryland
Pennsylvania Dutch culture in Maryland
Westminster, Maryland
National Register of Historic Places in Carroll County, Maryland